Casein kinase II subunit beta is a protein that in humans is encoded by the CSNK2B gene.

This gene encodes the beta subunit of casein kinase II, a ubiquitous protein kinase which regulates metabolic pathways, signal transduction, transcription, translation, and replication. The enzyme localizes to the endoplasmic reticulum and the Golgi apparatus.

Casein kinase, a ubiquitous, well-conserved protein kinase involved in cell metabolism and differentiation, is characterised by its preference for Serine or Threonine in acidic stretches of amino acids. The enzyme is a tetramer of 2 alpha- and 2 beta-subunits. However, some species (e.g., mammals) possess 2 related forms of the alpha-subunit (alpha and alpha'), while others (e.g., fungi) possess 2 related beta-subunits (beta and beta'). The alpha-subunit is the catalytic unit and contains regions characteristic of serine/threonine protein kinases. The beta-subunit is believed to be regulatory, possessing an N-terminal auto-phosphorylation site, an internal acidic domain, and a potential metal-binding motif. The beta subunit is a highly conserved protein of about 25kDa that contains, in its central section, a cysteine-rich motif, CX(n)C, that could be involved in binding a metal such as zinc. The mammalian beta-subunit gene promoter shares common features with those of other mammalian protein kinases and is closely related to the promoter of the regulatory subunit of cAMP-dependent protein kinase.

Interactions
CSNK2B has been shown to interact with CD163, CSNK2A2, Casein kinase 2, alpha 1, FGF1, TRIB3, CDC34, Ribosomal protein L5, BTF3, BRCA1, RNF7, P70-S6 Kinase 1 and APC.

References

External links
 
 PDBe-KB provides an overview of all the structure information available in the PDB for Human Casein kinase II subunit beta (CSNK2B)

Further reading

Protein domains